Chocolay Charter Township is a charter township of Marquette County in the U.S. state of Michigan. The population was 5,899 at the 2020 census. The township is named for the Chocolay River

Geography

Communities

Demographics

At the 2000 census, there were 7,148 people, 2,324 households and 1,743 families residing in the township. The racial makeup, based on self-reporting, was 86.64% White, 8.66% African American, 2.01% Native American, 0.57% Asian, 0.07% Pacific Islander, 0.29% from other races, and 1.75% from two or more races. Hispanic or Latino of any race were 0.80% of the population. Based on self-reporting in Census 2000, 12.7% were of Finnish, 11.1% German, 10.5% French, 8.6% English, 7.6% Irish, 5.6% Swedish and 5.1% Italian ancestry.

There were 2,324 households, of which 35.8% had children under the age of 18 living with them, 63.6% were married couples living together, 7.4% had a female householder with no husband present, and 25.0% were non-families. 21.0% of all households were made up of individuals, and 6.0% had someone living alone who was 65 years of age or older. The average household size was 2.60 and the average family size was 3.00.

22.0% of the population were under the age of 18, 8.2% from 18 to 24, 34.0% from 25 to 44, 27.8% from 45 to 64, and 8.1% who were 65 years of age or older. The median age was 38 years. For every 100 females, there were 139.0 males.  For every 100 females age 18 and over, there were 150.5 males.

The median household income was $49,438 and the median family income was $55,972. Males had a median income of $39,282 and females $27,500. The per capita income was $19,569.  About 3.0% of families and 4.9% of the population were below the poverty line, including 5.0% of those under age 18 and 1.1% of those age 65 or over.

References

External links
Chocolay Charter Township home page

Townships in Marquette County, Michigan
Charter townships in Michigan
Populated places established in 1860
1860 establishments in Michigan
Michigan populated places on Lake Superior